Epioblasma walkeri, common name the tan riffleshell, is a species of freshwater mussel, an aquatic bivalve mollusk in the family Unionidae, the river mussels.

Many scientists now recognize this mussel as synonymous or a subspecies of the presumed extinct Epioblasma florentina due to integrating shell characteristics between them.

References

walkeri
ESA endangered species